Erik Patterson is an American screenwriter, television writer, and playwright.

Life and career

Erik is a graduate of Occidental College and the British American Drama Academy.

His plays have been produced by Playwrights' Arena, the Los Angeles Theatre Center, Theatre of NOTE, Evidence Room, and The Actors' Gang, and developed through the Lark Play Development Center, Moving Arts, Black Dahlia, Naked Angels, and the Mark Taper Forum. He has had monologues published by Heinemann and Smith & Kraus.

Along with writing partner Jessica Scott, he has written screenplays for Warner Premiere, ABC Family, the Disney Channel, The Hatchery, and Universal.

Erik currently lives in Los Angeles, California.

Awards

He won a 2012 Humanitas Prize for "Radio Rebel".

He won a 2010 Writers Guild of America Award for Best Children's Script (Long Form) for Another Cinderella Story.

He was nominated in the 40th Daytime Emmy Awards for Outstanding Writing in a Children's Series for "R.L. Stine's The Haunting Hour". He was nominated in the same category for the 41st Daytime Emmy Awards.

His play He Asked For It was nominated for a 2009 GLAAD Media Award for Outstanding Los Angeles Theater. It was nominated for a 2008 Ovation Award for World Premiere Playwriting, as well as being named one of the Top 10 Plays of 2008 by Frontiers Magazine. In 2003, his play Yellow Flesh Alabaster Rose won a Backstage West Garland Award for Best Playwriting and was a finalist for the PEN USA Literary Award. In 2004, his play Red Light Green Light was nominated for an Ovation Award for World Premiere Playwriting.

His play "One of the Nice Ones" was nominated for a 2016 Ovation Award for World Premiere Playwriting, and it won the 2017 Los Angeles Drama Critics Circle Award for Best Playwriting.

Work

Plays

Handjob (2019)
One of the Nice Ones (2016)
"The Sex Lives of Strangers" (unproduced)
Sick (2010)
He Asked for It (2008)
Red Light Green Light (2004)
Yellow Flesh Alabaster Rose (2003)
Tonseisha (2001)

Film and TV
{| class="wikitable sortable"
|-
! colspan="3" style="background: LightSteelBlue;" | Movies
|-
! Year !! Title !! Film production
|-
| 2022
| Abandoned
| Vertical Entertainment
|-
| 2021
| Sister Swap: Christmas in the City
| Hallmark Channel
|-
| 2021
| Sister Swap: A Hometown Holiday
| Hallmark Channel
|-
| 2018
| Deep Blue Sea 2
| Warner Bros.
|-
| 2017
| Love at First Bark
| Hallmark Channel
|-
| 2016
| Love on a Limb
| Hallmark Channel
|-
| rowspan="2" | 2015
| The Christmas Note| Lighthouse Pictures
|-
| Love Under the Stars| Two 4 The Money Media
|-
| 2014
| Sophia Grace & Rosie's Royal Adventure| Warner Bros.
|-
| 2012
| Radio Rebel| Disney Channel
|-
| 2011
| A Cinderella Story: Once Upon a Song| Warner Premiere
|-
| 2008
| Another Cinderella Story| Warner Premiere
|}

He has written several episodes of the television series R.L. Stine's The Haunting Hour'' including:

 "Best Friend Forever" (1.12)
 "Wrong Number" (1.16)
 "The Perfect Brother" (1.20)
 "Pumpkinhead" (2.5)
 "Brush With Madness" (2.6)
 "The Hole" (2.10)
 "Stage Fright" (2.15)
 "Grampires: Part 1" (3.1)
 "Grampires: Part 2" (3.2)
 "Poof de Fromage" (3.15)
 "Funhouse" 
 "Bad Egg" 
 "Near Mint Condition"
 "Return of the Pumpkinheads"

References

External links 
 

Year of birth missing (living people)
Living people
Occidental College alumni
American male screenwriters
American television writers
American dramatists and playwrights
American male television writers
American male dramatists and playwrights
American LGBT dramatists and playwrights